Giovanni Luigi Marescotti (died 1587) was a Roman Catholic prelate who served as Bishop of Strongoli (1585–1587).

Biography
On 14 January 1585, Giovanni Luigi Marescotti was appointed by Pope Gregory XIII as Bishop of Strongoli.
He served as Bishop of Strongoli until his death in 1587.

References

External links and additional sources
 (for Chronology of Bishops) 
 (for Chronology of Bishops) 

16th-century Italian Roman Catholic bishops
1587 deaths
Bishops appointed by Pope Gregory XIII